Enhanced Small Disk Interface (ESDI) is an obsolete disk interface designed by Maxtor Corporation in the early 1980s to be a follow-on to the ST-412/506 interface. ESDI improved on ST-506 by moving certain parts that were traditionally kept on the controller (such as the data separator) into the drives themselves, and also generalizing the control bus such that more kinds of devices (such as removable disks and tape drives) could be connected. ESDI uses the same cabling as ST-506 (one 34-pin common control cable, and a 20-pin data channel cable for each device), and thus could easily be retrofitted to ST-506 applications. 

ESDI was popular in the mid-to-late 1980s, when SCSI and IDE technologies were young and immature, and ST-506 was neither fast nor flexible enough. ESDI could handle data rates of 10, 15, or 20 Mbit/s (as opposed to ST-506's top speed of 7.5 Mbit/s), and many high-end SCSI drives of the era were actually high-end ESDI drives with SCSI bridges integrated on the drive. 

By 1990, SCSI had matured enough to handle high data rates and multiple types of drives, and ATA was quickly overtaking ST-506 in the desktop market. These two events made ESDI less and less important over time, and by the mid-1990s, ESDI was no longer in common use.

Connector pinouts

References

 Micropolis ESDI X3.170-90 Interface Specification
 ESDI Specification, Magnetic Peripherals Inc, 1984
 IBM ESDI Fixed Disk Drive Adapter/A Technical Reference

Computer storage buses